Patua Sangeet or Poter Gan is a cultural tradition of Bengal Patachitra. It is performed by a Patua. It is famous in the village part of West Bengal like Birbhum, Jhargram, Bardhaman and Murshidabad as a folk song of West Bengal.

Classification
There are three types of Patua Sangeet according to the difference of Patachitra and there mythological stories. This lyrical drama is written about the Krishnilila, Gouranglila, Ramlila, Shib-Parbotiilila etc. is called Lila kahini. Panch Kalyani type music is not based on any particular story or adaptation. There are many sense of various gods and goddesses. So it's called Pancha Kalyani, the mixer of various stories. Gopalan or Cattlefarming story is another type of Patua Sangeet.

Regions
Patua sangeet was prevalent in the entire the hole Bengal region, but now it is heard in Birbhum, West Midnapore, Nayagram of Pingla block in Jhargram, Bardhaman and Murshidabad district in West Bengal.

Relation between Patachitra and Patua sangeet
Patua sangeet is not merely an emulation of Patachitra. It describes the inner meaning and thought of the Patachitra. Thus Patachitra and Patua sangeet are mutually dependent.

The perfect form of Bengali life

Patterns
Although the culture of Patua Sangeet is fading, some songs are still heard in some places of West Bengal. There are some ideas of pat singing from the different writers who compiled the songs.

Pancha Kalyani giti

Krishna pater giti

Jam pater giti

Gajir pot giti

Artist
 Dukhushyam
 Pulin Chitrakar
 Gouri Chitrakar
 Rani Chitrakar

See also
 Patachitra
 Patua
 Chalchitra

References

Culture of West Bengal
Bengali folk songs